Dearne North is a ward in the Dearne Valley in the metropolitan borough of Barnsley, South Yorkshire, England.  The ward contains seven listed buildings that are recorded in the National Heritage List for England.  All the listed buildings are designated at Grade II, the lowest of the three grades, which is applied to "buildings of national importance and special interest".  The ward contains the villages of Goldthorpe and Thurnscoe, and the listed buildings consist of two houses and associated structures, a farmhouse, two churches, and a war memorial.


Buildings

References

Citations

Sources

 

Lists of listed buildings in South Yorkshire
Buildings and structures in the Metropolitan Borough of Barnsley